Rybino is a rural locality (a village) in Yenangskoye Rural Settlement, Kichmengsko-Gorodetsky District, Vologda Oblast, Russia. The population was 23 as of 2002.

Geography 
Rybino is located 41 km southeast of Kichmengsky Gorodok (the district's administrative centre) by road. Slobodka is the nearest rural locality.

References 

Rural localities in Kichmengsko-Gorodetsky District